Abt Electronics  is an independent family-owned retailer in the United States of consumer electronics, major appliances, and furniture. Abt Electronics now distributes products from coast to coast in the US. The company has operated in the Chicago market since 1936.

History 
Abt Electronics was founded in 1936 when Jewel Abt gave $800 to her husband David Abt to start a business. The store was originally named Abt Radio as it only sold small electronics in its early days. The original location was a small storefront and service department in the Logan Square area of Chicago. Abt Electronics has expanded many times over the years. Abt electronics currently employs more than 1,650 employees in a 450,000 square feet retail store and warehouse in Glenview, Illinois, a suburb of Chicago. In May 2021, Abt announced plans for a 430,000 square-foot addition to their warehouse, effectively doubling the total area of their facility. Construction on the addition is expected to be completed in October 2021. In 2021, Abt settled one of many lawsuits, this time with Justin Gibbs, who is African America. were it was alleged "Gibbs and his Black co-workers" were required to work under conditions, "which required them to miss meal breaks and urinate in empty bottles."

Timeline 
1936 - Jewel and Dave Abt open Abt Radio with $800, located at 2835 N. Milwaukee, Chicago, selling small electronics
1953 - Bob Abt (former CEO; died July 23, 2015) begins working at Abt Radio part-time and over summers.
1955 - Abt moves to Logan Square Location at 2858 N. Milwaukee Ave., Chicago. Merchandise is kept off-site at the Hollander warehouse. One van made all the deliveries.
1971 - The Abt family opens a store in Niles, Illinois.
1977 - The Logan Square location closes.
1990 - The Niles store closes on December 9.
1990 - Abt's fourth location, in Morton Grove, Illinois, opens for business December 10.
1990 - Recycling program begins.
1997 - Abt.com was launches. Abt becomes an authorized online retailer for brands like Sony, Panasonic, Toshiba, Bose, and Onkyo.
2002 - Abt closes the Morton Grove store. On May 26 Abt's fifth location, in Glenview, Illinois, opens for business.
2005 - May 25, the city of Chicago dedicates the corner of Wolfram and Milwaukee Ave. to Jewel and David Abt. The new corner is called Jewel and David Abt Way.
2008 - Jewel and David Abt are inducted into the 2008 Consumer Electronics Hall of Fame.
2008 - The Abt Design Center opens in June.
2008 - The  recycling center opens in October.
2008 - Abt is chosen as the Chicago Tribune's Top Workplace in Chicago.
2009 - Abt's Mobile Installation department is voted one of the top 100 best retailers and installers from Mobile Electronics Inc.
2010 - Abt is chosen as the 2010 Dealer of the Year by home automation company Control4
2010 - Abt is voted in the top 10 of Chicago Tribune's "Top Chicago Workplaces" for the best place to work in the Chicago area.
2010-2020 - Voted the "Best Place to Buy Large Appliances" by Consumer Reports for eleven consecutive years
2011 - Voted the #1 place to work in Chicago Tribune's "Top Chicago Workplaces"
2012 - Voted the #1 place to work in Chicago Tribune's "Top Chicago Workplaces"
2013 - Voted the #20 place to work for nationwide by WorkplaceDynamics
2016 - Voted the #1 place to work in Chicago Tribune's "Top Chicago Workplaces"
2016 - Receives the Better Business Bureau Torch Award for Marketplace Ethics
2016 - Abt completes installation of a 1500-panel rooftop solar array, capable of producing 850 megawatts of power per year
2020 - Receives the Better Business Bureau Torch Award for Marketplace Ethics
2021 - Abt's new 30,000 square foot recycling center opens
2021 - Abt is voted one of Consumer Reports' "Best Place to Buy Small Appliances"
2021 - Construction starts on a new 429,524-square-foot building addition that will double Abt's warehouse space

Environmental practices
In 2006, Abt built a recycling center which collects the company's used cardboard, plastic and plastic-foam packaging and prepares it to be sold for recycling. Abt opened a new, 30,000 square-foot recycling center in 2021. The company's recycling program prevents an estimated 2.2 million pounds of cardboard, 350,000 pounds of styrofoam, 1.4 million pounds of electronics, and 13 million pounds of appliances from ending up in landfills. In October 2016, Abt completed work on a rooftop solar panel array. The system comprises more than 1,500 solar panels and has an annual production capacity of 645,000 kWh electricity. The energy produced by the solar array powers regular building operations and is stored in a 500 kW Tesla PowerPack battery cluster.

References

External links
Official website
Company blog

Consumer electronics retailers in the United States
Companies based in Glenview, Illinois
Retail companies established in 1936
1936 establishments in Illinois
Family-owned companies of the United States